Joakim Pirinen (born 28 May 1961 in Solna, Stockholm County) is a Swedish illustrator, author, and comic creator. One of the most acclaimed artists to make his debut during the 1980s wave of "artistic" and "adult" comics in Sweden, Pirinen was, and still is, a regular contributor to the Swedish alternative comics magazine Galago.

Pirinen's comic album debut came in 1984 with Välkommen Till Sandlådan ("Welcome to the Sandbox"), but his true breakthrough came with Socker-Conny ("Sugar-Conny") in 1985, a graphic novel about an anarchistic borderline personality.

Pirinen has a very distinct and unique style, playing as few of his peers with art and language, with time and space. He has also written some rather unusual prose.

Personal life
Pirinen is of Finnish descent through his father who was sent to Sweden as a Finnish war child during World War II.

References

External links
Galago

1961 births
Living people
People from Solna Municipality
Swedish cartoonists
Swedish illustrators
Swedish-language writers
Swedish comics artists
Swedish comics writers
Swedish people of Finnish descent